Said Farouk Al-Turki (born 27 September 1943) is a Saudi Arabian athlete. He competed in the men's discus throw at the 1972 Summer Olympics.

References

External links
 

1943 births
Living people
Athletes (track and field) at the 1972 Summer Olympics
Saudi Arabian male discus throwers
Olympic athletes of Saudi Arabia
Place of birth missing (living people)